The Stratton Story is a 1949 American biographical film directed by Sam Wood that tells the true story of Monty Stratton, a Major League Baseball pitcher who pitched for the Chicago White Sox from 1934 to 1938. The film is the first of three to pair stars Jimmy Stewart and June Allyson, followed by The Glenn Miller Story and Strategic Air Command. Stratton commented that Stewart "did a great job of playing me, in a picture which I figure was about as true to life as they could make it."

The Stratton Story was a financial success and won the Academy Award for Best Motion Picture  Story.

Plot
Texas farm boy Monty Stratton demonstrates a knack for pitching a baseball. With the help of Barney Wile, a retired catcher who is now a scout, he manages to arrange a tryout with the Chicago White Sox during the team's spring training in California. He shows promise and is given a contract.

On his first evening at spring training, Stratton is introduced to a young woman named Ethel. They start dating and fall in love, but Stratton must leave from Ethel to travel to Chicago. When he is sent down to a minor league team, he proposes marriage. He is called back up to the White Sox and returns to Chicago with his newlywed bride, and by the end of the season, they are expecting a child.

The next season, Stratton is pitching during a road game and cannot focus because he is thinking of his wife giving birth in Chicago. When he is notified that he has a son, he throws a wild pitch and is pulled from the game smiling.

As his career progresses, Stratton improves so much that he is voted an All-Star in the American League. In the offseason of 1938, he accidentally shoots himself in the right leg while hunting on his farm in Texas. When his leg must be amputated, it appears as though his pitching career is over and he enters a very dark, brooding period. Nevertheless, with the support of his wife and a wooden leg, Stratton learns to walk along with his baby boy. He works hard and starts practicing his pitching again. He makes an inspirational, successful minor-league comeback in 1946.

Cast
 James Stewart as Monty Stratton
 June Allyson as Ethel
 Frank Morgan as Barney Wile
 Agnes Moorehead as Ma Stratton
 Bill Williams as Eddie Dibson
 Bruce Cowling as Ted Lyons
 Cliff Clark as Josh Higgins
 Mary Lawrence as Dot
 Dean White as Luke Appling
 Robert Gist as Earnie
 Gene Bearden as Himself
 Bill Dickey as Himself
 Jimmy Dykes as Himself
 Mervyn "Merv" Shea as Himself

Agnes Moorehead, who played the role of Monty Stratton's mother, was only seven years James Stewart's senior.

Warner Bros. contract player Ronald Reagan sought the title role, but the studio refused to loan him to MGM because it believed that the film would be a failure.

Van Johnson was announced at one stage to play the lead.

Historical inaccuracy
The movie falsely indicates that Stratton's debut for the Chicago White Sox was part of a catastrophic 16–0 loss to the New York Yankees. However, Stratton's MLB debut occurred on Saturday, June 2, 1934 in a White Sox home game at Comiskey Park versus the Detroit Tigers. Detroit already held a 10–0 lead and had two runners on base when Stratton entered the game in relief with two outs in the sixth inning. Stratton retired the Tigers in that inning without any further runs scored. Over the game's final three innings, Stratton allowed two more runs (both earned) on four hits as the Tigers won 12–0. It was Stratton's only major-league appearance of the 1934 season.

Production
Scenes were staged at various baseball parks, including:
 Brookside Park in Pasadena, a spring training site for the White Sox
Comiskey Park in Chicago, the home field of Stratton's team, the White Sox
 Gilmore Field, the home of the Hollywood Stars of the Pacific Coast League, used in the final scenes of the film that were set in Texas
 Wrigley Field (Los Angeles)
Stock footage was used to depict several other American League baseball parks in establishing shots.

Reception
According to MGM records, the film earned $3,831,000 in the U.S. and Canada and $657,000 overseas, resulting in a profit of $1,211,000. It was one of the most popular films of the year.

Radio adaptation
The story was adapted for a one-hour CBS Lux Radio Theatre episode broadcast on February 13, 1950 that was entitled "The Stratton Story." Stewart and Allyson repeated their roles for the program.

References

External links
 
 
 
 
 

1949 films
1940s biographical drama films
1940s sports films
American baseball films
American biographical drama films
American black-and-white films
Biographical films about sportspeople
Chicago White Sox
Cultural depictions of American men
Cultural depictions of baseball players
Films about amputees
Films directed by Sam Wood
Films scored by Adolph Deutsch
Films that won the Academy Award for Best Story
Metro-Goldwyn-Mayer films
Sports films based on actual events
1949 drama films
Photoplay Awards film of the year winners
1940s English-language films
1940s American films
Films about disability